Yijiawan is a town located in the Yuetang District of Xiangtan, Hunan, China.

References

Towns of Hunan